Östers IF ("Östers Idrottsförening", or simply "Öster") competed in ice hockey until 1971, when their ice hockey department merged with the hockey department of Växjö IK to form Växjö HC.  During its existence, Öster's hockey club managed many years  of play in the upper tiers of Swedish ice hockey, including one season (1963–64) in Sweden's top league, at the time called Division 1.

References

External links
 Profile on Eliteprospects.com

Sport in Kronoberg County
Defunct ice hockey teams in Sweden
1971 disestablishments in Sweden
Ice hockey clubs disestablished in 1971
Östers IF